This is a list of the counts of Burgundy, i.e., of the region known as Franche-Comté, not to be confused with the Duchy of Burgundy, from 982 to 1678.

House of Ivrea (982–1190)

House of Hohenstaufen (1190–1231)

House of Andechs (1231–1279)

House of Ivrea (1279–1330)

House of Capet (1330–1347)

House of Burgundy (1347–1361)

House of Capet (1361–1382)

House of Dampierre (1382–1404)

House of Valois-Burgundy (1405–1482)

House of Habsburg (1482–1678) 

In 1678 the County of Burgundy was annexed by France as part of the Treaty of Nijmegen.

House of Bourbon, claimants to the title (1700–1713)

Philip IX (King Philip V of Spain) (1700–1713, titular only)

House of Habsburg (1713–present)
Charles IV (Emperor Charles VI) (1713–1740 titular only)
Maria Theresa (1740–1780 titular only)
Francis I (Emperor Francis I) (1740–1765 with his wife, titular only)
Joseph (Emperor Joseph II) (1780–1790 titular only)
Leopold (Emperor Leopold II) (1790–1792 titular only)
Francis II (Emperor Francis II) (1792–1795\1835)
Ferdinand (Emperor Ferdinand I) (1835–1848 titular only)
Franz Joseph (Emperor Franz Joseph I) (1848–1916 titular only)
Charles V (Emperor Charles I) (1916–1918 titular only later renounced)

See also
 Countess of Burgundy
 Kingdom of Burgundy
 King of Burgundy
 Duchy of Burgundy
 Duke of Burgundy
 County of Burgundy
 Dukes of Burgundy family tree
 Count of Poitiers (since John the Magnificent)

References

 
History of Franche-Comté